Jack Shephard (born 25 July 1997) is an English para-badminton player who plays in SS6 events for players who have short stature and achondroplasia.

Achievements

World Championships 

Men's singles

Men's doubles

Mixed doubles

European Championships 
Men's singles

Men's doubles

Doubles

Mixed doubles

References

Notes 

1997 births
Living people
Sportspeople from Chesterfield, Derbyshire
English male badminton players
Paralympic badminton players of Great Britain
Badminton players at the 2020 Summer Paralympics
British para-badminton players